Le Soir ("The Evening") is a French-language Belgian daily newspaper. Founded in 1887 by Emile Rossel, it was intended as a politically independent source of news. It is one of the most popular Francophone newspapers in Belgium, competing with La Libre Belgique, and since 2005 has appeared in Berliner format. It is owned by Rossel & Cie, which also owns several Belgian news outlets and the French paper La Voix du Nord.

History and profile
Le Soir was founded as a free advertising newspaper in 1887. Later it became a paying paper.

When Belgium was occupied during the Second World War, Le Soir continued to be published under German censorship, unlike many Belgian newspapers which went underground. The paper, which became known as "Le Soir Volé" (or "Stolen Le Soir"), was parodied by the resistance group, the Front de l'Indépendance which in 1943 published a satirical pro-Allied edition of the paper, dubbed the "Faux Soir" (or "Fake Soir"), which was mixed with official copies of the paper and distributed to news kiosks in Brussels. The "Stolen Le Soir" was notable for including Hergé's The Adventures of Tintin cartoons in serialized form during the war.

The renewed production of the "Free Le Soir", under Lucien Fuss, restarted on 6 September 1944, just days after the Allied Liberation of Brussels. The publisher of the paper is Rossel company.

Circulation
In the period of 1995–96 Le Soir had a circulation of 182,798 copies. Its 2002 circulation was 130,495 copies with a market share of 20.3%. The circulation of the paper was 104,000 copies in 2003 and 101,000 copies in 2004.

Editorial stance
Compared to its centre-right Catholic competitor, La Libre Belgique, Le Soir is seen as liberal and progressive with politically federalist leanings.

Reaffirmed on the occasion of the release of the new format on 15 November 2005, Le Soir describes its editorial stance as "a progressive and independent daily newspaper." It describes its aims to be a "counterweight" and "always alert, in line with society".

It describes its role as:

Google controversy
The newspaper gained some notoriety on the internet after it successfully sued the search engine Google for copyright infringement. The case was built on the fact that Google made parts of the newspaper's website available through its search engine and its Google News service, even after the articles in question had been removed from the newspaper's website. A Belgian judge ruled that this did not conform to Belgian regulations and ordered Google to remove all "copyright violations" from its websites. Google responded by removing all links to the newspaper not only from its news service but also from its search index.

Charlie Hebdo bomb threat
In response to the terrorist attack on Charlie Hebdo in which 12 people died on 7 January 2015, some international organizations such as Reporters Without Borders and the Index on Censorship called for controversial Charlie Hebdo cartoons to be re-published in solidarity with the French satirical magazine and in defense of free speech. The Hamburger Morgenpost included Charlie Hebdo cartoons on its front cover on 8 January and was subsequently firebombed.

Le Soir faced bomb threats for republishing Charlie Hebdo cartoons, including many satirising religion.

See also

 Philippe Servaty
 Faux Soir

References

External links 
  

1887 establishments in Belgium
French-language newspapers published in Belgium
Newspapers published in Brussels
Newspapers established in 1887